So Much Love to Give is a 2020 Argentine comedy film directed by Marcos Carnevale, written by Adrián Suar and Marcos Carnevale and starring Soledad Villamil, Adrián Suar and Gabriela Toscano.

Cast 
 Soledad Villamil as Vera
 Adrián Suar as Fernando Ferro
 Gabriela Toscano as Paula
 Darío Barassi
 Betiana Blum
 Alan Sabbagh
 Magela Zanotta

Release 
So Much Love to Give was released on September 9, 2020.

References

External links
 
 
 

2020 films
2020 comedy films
Argentine comedy films
2020s Argentine films
2020s Spanish-language films
Spanish-language Netflix original films
Films impacted by the COVID-19 pandemic
Films not released in theaters due to the COVID-19 pandemic